International Villager is an album by Punjabi music artist Yo Yo Honey Singh. It was released on 11/11/2011.

The song "Gabru" from the album had spent some time on top of the iTunes charts.

The music videos for the tracks "Dope Shope", "Gabru", "Angreji Beat", "Goliyan", "Get Up Jawani" and "Brown Rang" from the album have since been released. The music video of "Brown Rang" was YouTube's most trending video in India in 2012.

The song "Angreji Beat", was used in the soundtrack of the film Cocktail (2012). International Villager has become the highest grossing Punjabi album of all time.

Track listing 
The music of the album has been composed and programmed by Yo Yo Honey Singh.

References 

2011 albums
Yo Yo Honey Singh albums